EverLine is a fully automated driverless  people mover line in Yongin, Gyeonggi Province, Seoul Capital Area connecting Everland, South Korea's most popular theme park, to the Suin-Bundang Line of the Seoul Metropolitan Subway, a system which it is arguably a part of. The system is identical to the AirTrain JFK people mover and airport rail link in New York City, using single-car Bombardier Advanced Rapid Transit vehicles controlled by Bombardier CITYFLO 650 automatic train control technology.

Ground was broken for construction in November 2005. Starting in November 2009, the operating company conducted test runs of the trains. The opening was delayed several times but finally opened for service on April 26, 2013. A physical transfer to the (underground) Suin-Bundang line at Giheung Station opened on January 9, 2014 and a transfer discount to the line was introduced on September 20 of the same year.

Operation
Trains run every 6 minutes (9 minutes on Sundays and holidays). One-car trains are operated, a feature unique to this Advanced Rapid Transit (ART) system; trains can be lengthened to two cars if necessary, similar to the AirTrain JFK.

Stations

Ridership 
Ridership was lower than expected on opening day; around 9,000 people per day in April 2013. It grew to around 30,000 people per day by April 2015. The increase is touted to be the result of a fare intergration program introduced in September 2014.

Expansion
There are plans to extend the line  from Giheung Station to Gwanggyo Station on the Shinbundang Line.

Additionally, Neotrans, the operator of the Shinbundang Line, took over operations in 2016.

Corruption allegations

South Korean authorities is investigated for possible corruption by Bombardier Transportation officials over the building of this line and concerns that ridership was exaggerated to have the technology preferentially chosen over other contenders. No charges were filed due to a lack of presented evidence and the case reaching its statute of limitation.

References

External links
 Official Homepage in Korean
 Korean National Railway press release
 frdb.wo.to site's EverLine page (in Korean) including detailed information, maps and renderings

 
Yongin
Linear motor metros
Light rail in South Korea
Seoul Metropolitan Subway lines